Gulf United Football Club is an Emirati professional football club that started as an academy in Dubai. They currently play in the UAE Second Division, after promotion from the UAE Third Division in the 2021–22 season. The club is well known for  nurturing young talent, playing exhibition matches against professional overseas teams and for being one of leading football brands in the Middle-East.

History

Founding 
In 2019, the Gulf United academy was founded by a group of English football coaches from Manchester, and has since become one of the market leaders. The club has youth teams from ages 7-23 in the academy, as well as being a professional club. Gulf United brings expert coaches from all around the world to Dubai and describes itself as a club 'driven on player development'.

UAE Third Division 
In the 2021–22 season, Gulf United entered the UAE Third Division, a league that allows privately owned clubs and academies to join the UAE Football Pyramid. Soon after Steven Taylor was announced as the manager.

The 2021-22 UAE Third Division Season was formatted as two groups, where the winner of each group would face the runner-up of the other group in a play-off for promotion. Gulf United went unbeaten in the group stages finishing first in Group A. They faced Abtal Al Khaeej in the semi-final's, which was in a home & away format. Gulf United lost the first leg 1-0, and won the second leg 2-0, officially securing promotion to the UAE Second Division. 

Gulf United then faced Group B winners Fleetwood United in the UAE Third Division final and were crowned eventual champions of the Third Division after beating Fleetwood United, sister club of Fleetwood Town 3-1 in the final of the inaugural season, with 2 goals from Nana Cédrick 'Nana' Djeunou and 1 from Bonet Bobai, cementing them as UAE Third Division Champions.

UAE Second Division 
The 2022-23 season was the clubs first in the UAE Second Division. The squad was strengthened with signings such as Devonte Redmond, Soheil Varahram and Max Johnstone as well as further signings in the January transfer window with former Real Madrid player Mink Peeters and former Celtic & Norwich City striker Gary Hooper.

After drawing their first game, Gulf United went on to win 5 games in a row, going into the Christmas period at the top of the league.

International Friendlies 
The club regularly plays in exhibition matches against global opponents showcasing the clubs young talent. In January 2022, Gulf United played with 7-time Slovakian Super Liga winners MSK Zilina. In February 2022, Gulf United played a friendly fixture against FC Riga, a game in which Gulf United player Manyumow Achol was subsequently scouted and signed for FK Auda.

Gulf United also played Premier League side Newcastle United in a friendly match at NAS Sports Complex on the 24 March 2022, in which Newcastle won 5–0 with goals from Allan Saint-Maximin, Joelinton and Dwight Gayle.

On 6 January 2023, Gulf United played a friendly against Al Ain FC, the 21-22 UAE Pro League defending champions, and who are widely recognised as being the most successful club in the UAE. The match ended 1-0 to Al Ain FC with a goal scored by UAE international Bandar Al-Ahbabi.

Partnerships 
In September 2021, Gulf United signed a deal with Adidas, making them the first grassroots football academy in the Middle East to partner with Adidas. In November 2021, they built the regions' first ever floating football pitch at the #NoFilterDXB event in Dubai Harbour, Dubai The event drew regional and global attention after featuring on a Sidemen video.

In December 2021, Zinedine Zidane visited Gulf United to feature in an 'Impossible Is Nothing' campaign.

Media 
'We are Gulf United' is a YouTube docuseries which followed the club in their first season in professional football during the 2021-22 UAE Third Division season. Debuted on the 1st April 2022, the series has amassed over 2,000,000 views. With the final episode with gaining over 1,000,000 views, making it the single highest viewed Youtube video of any club in all the UAE Football Leagues.

Current squad

Honours 
UAE Second Division League
Champions (1): 2022–23
UAE Third Division League
Champions (1): 2021–22

See also 

 List of football clubs in the United Arab Emirates

References

External links 

Gulf United FC at GSA
Gulf United FC at BeSoccer
Gulf United FC at FootballManager

Football clubs in Dubai
Dubai City
Association football clubs established in 2019
2019 establishments in the United Arab Emirates